Shangxi is a town of central Zhejiang province, China, located along the G60 Shanghai–Kunming Expressway to the west of Yiwu, which administers it, and the northeast of Jinhua.

References 

Township-level divisions of Zhejiang